Dart  is a fictional Image Comics superhero created by Erik Larsen. She first appeared in 1992, in Savage Dragon #2 (ongoing series). There were three people who taken up the mantle The First was Jill August, the second was her niece Alison Summers, using the mantle to become a supervillain, and then the third and current Dart is Jane August, Jill's sister.

Publication history
Dart has appeared in numerous issues of Savage Dragon as a supporting character, as well as being a major character in the Freak Force series and subsequent mini-series.  In February 1996, she received her own eponymous three-issue limited series, written by Julie Ditrich and Bruce Love with artwork by Jozef Szekeres.

Fictional character biography
Jill August was born on August 12, 1969, in Detroit, Michigan.  She grew up timid and demoralized, witnessing her mother's constant spousal abuse at the hands of her father, and her friends' abuse at the hands of a cruel coach at school.  She witnessed her father beat her mother to death, a crime for which he was sentenced to life in prison, effectively leaving Jill an orphan.

As a teenager, Jill saw a female friend being assaulted by several men in a bar in Detroit.  Attempting to intervene, she fell against a dartboard hung on the barroom wall, and the men began to attack her as well.  Instinctively, she used the darts to defend herself, throwing them at her attackers with astonishing accuracy, seriously injuring all of them.  She subsequently decided to use this newly discovered skill to both help others and manage her feelings of helplessness (and the rage that comes with those feelings).

Jill trained herself in a number of martial arts disciplines and sharpened her already formidable dart-throwing accuracy.  She designed a costume and took the name "Dart" to become a superhero in Detroit.  Early in her career, she occasionally teamed up with another Detroit-based hero, the narcissistic Kill-Cat.

After spending three years as a Detroit-based costumed vigilante, Dart was contacted by the Chicago Police Department to solicit her participation in a new program wherein super-powered vigilantes would be recruited into the police department for legitimate service.  She accepted and moved to Chicago where she met the Savage Dragon, Ricochet, Horridus, Barbaric and other super-powered recruits.  The program was a failure, though, as most of the costumed heroes could not or would not cope with the realities of everyday police work (such as wearing a police uniform instead of a costume).  These recruits quit en masse and, along with newfound friends Superpatriot and Mighty Man formed their own heroes-for-hire outfit known as Freak Force, under the nominal leadership of Dart.

Dart attempts to assist in a reality-disruption event; however its very nature causes many of the participants to forget that there even was a problem.

After a few years of reasonable success as independent troubleshooters, Dart and most of the Freak Force were recruited by the United States government to replace Youngblood, who were presumed to have been killed by Martians.  This new group was called the Special Operations Strikeforce (S.O.S.), although Dart was refused active status for a number of months due to administrators' reservations about her reliability.

Once she was allowed active status, Dart participated in a raid on the fictional nation of Lieberheim to assassinate the super-powered dictator Dread Knight.  During the battle, Dart was hit by an energy blast that vaporized both of her legs to just above the knee.

Due to her disability, Dart was relegated to a role as Strikeforce's team trainer.  Several years later, Dart and other former members of Freak Force were attacked by an evil Mighty Man while attending the funeral of Ann Stevens (the second Mighty Man).  In the ensuing battle the Savage Dragon killed this evil version, and the super-powerful Mighty Man persona was passed on to Dart, enabling her to transform into a massively powerful blond male by making a magic gesture of tapping her wrists together.

Alternate Earth
After issue #75 of the Savage Dragon, a second, alternate Earth was introduced into that universe.  Twenty-eight issues later, in #103, the original Earth was destroyed, killing virtually all of its inhabitants, including Dart, now the fourth Mighty Man.

The version of Dart from the alternate Earth continued to exist, however.  In that reality, she never lost her legs, but also never became Mighty Man.  Less than a year after the destruction of the original Earth, this alternate Dart was murdered by the villain, Mako, who punched her head off.

Jill August's niece, Alison Summers has since taken up the mantle of Dart, though Alison has become a murderous psychopath, rather than a hero.

It has also been revealed that, unbeknownst to her, Dart was the daughter of veteran super-hero Sgt. Marvel (a pastiche of sorts of Batman). Her past origin, involving her abusive father, is now considered non-canon by creator Erik Larsen

A third dart named Jane August who was Jill's sister and Alison's other aunt who had take up the mantle replacing her sister but unlike her niece Alison she was a hero just like the original.

Powers and abilities
Dart has an uncanny, almost preternatural accuracy with various forms of throwing darts, and is able to throw consistently on-target even while performing complicated gymnastic, acrobatic or martial arts maneuvers.  She carries with her a number of "trick" darts in addition to the normal ones that are merely razor sharp.  There are a number of different types of trick darts: some are explosive, some incendiary, and some release toxic or irritating gas, such as tear gas.  Dart is in excellent physical condition and is a skilled martial artist.

See also
Red Dart

Notes

Comics characters introduced in 1993
Fictional blade and dart throwers
Savage Dragon characters
Image Comics limited series
Image Comics female superheroes
Image Comics female supervillains
Characters created by Erik Larsen